Dennis DuVal (born March 31, 1952), nicknamed "Sweet D" is a former National Basketball Association (NBA) player.

College career
In 1970–71, Dennis played on the Syracuse Orange freshman basketball team. He averaged 19.2 points and 7.7 rebounds per game. Dennis joined the Syracuse varsity basketball team his sophomore season, and averaged 15.8 points and 4.8 rebounds per game. Dennis led Syracuse in scoring his junior season, averaging 19.6 points per game. He also led Syracuse in scoring his senior season, averaging 20.6 points per game. In his senior year at Syracuse University, Dennis was selected to the NCAA AP All-American third-team. When he graduated, he was second all-time in points for Syracuse behind only David Bing.

Professional career
Dennis was drafted with the twelfth pick in the second round of the 1974 NBA Draft by the Washington Bullets. Dennis was also selected by the Denver Nuggets in the 1974 ABA Draft. He was waived by the Bullets prior to the start of the 1975-76 NBA season. On January 31, 1976 Dennis was signed by the Atlanta Hawks. In his NBA career, Dennis averaged 1.9 points, 0.7 assists, and 0.6 rebounds per game.

Post playing career
Following his basketball career, Dennis became a police officer in Syracuse, New York. In 1990, he became the deputy police chief. In 2001, Dennis was named the Syracuse police chief. He retired from the Syracuse police force in 2004

In 2000, Dennis was selected to the Syracuse Men's Basketball All-Century Team.

Dennis is currently the Vice Chairman and Chief Operating Officer of Terradiol, a bio-pharmaceutical company which produces, manufactures, and distributes medical cannabis pharmaceuticals.

References

1952 births
Living people
African-American basketball players
All-American college men's basketball players
Atlanta Hawks players
Basketball players from New York (state)
People from Westbury, New York
Point guards
Sportspeople from Nassau County, New York
Syracuse Orange men's basketball players
Washington Bullets draft picks
Washington Bullets players
American men's basketball players
21st-century African-American people
20th-century African-American sportspeople